Autumn Story may refer to:

Autumn Story, Italian novel by Tommaso Landolfi
Autumn Story (Brambly Hedge), children's book 1980
An Autumn Story (film) (Bir Sonbahar Hikayesi) Turkish film
Autumn Story (TV series) (Gaeul Donghwa), Korean drama popular in Egypt 2000
Autumn Story (EP), by Korean boy band Astro

See also
An Autumn Tale, French film